Mel Tormé Swings Shubert Alley is a 1960 album by Mel Tormé, arranged by Marty Paich.

The Penguin Guide to Jazz Recordings selected the album as part of its suggested “core collection” of essential recordings.

Track listing 
 "Too Close for Comfort" (Jerry Bock, Larry Holofcener, George David Weiss) – 3:59
 "Once in Love with Amy" (Frank Loesser) – 3:08
 "A Sleepin' Bee" (Harold Arlen, Truman Capote) – 3:29
 "On the Street Where You Live" (Alan Jay Lerner, Frederick Loewe) – 2:51
 "All I Need Is a Girl" (Stephen Sondheim, Jule Styne) – 3:03
 "Just in Time" (Betty Comden, Adolph Green, Styne) – 3:23
 "Hello, Young Lovers" (Oscar Hammerstein II, Richard Rodgers) – 3:06
 "The Surrey with the Fringe on Top" (Hammerstein, Rodgers) – 2:57
 "Old Devil Moon" (Yip Harburg, Burton Lane) – 2:46
 "Whatever Lola Wants" (Richard Adler, Jerry Ross) – 3:18
 "Too Darn Hot" (Cole Porter) – 2:44
 "Lonely Town" (Leonard Bernstein, Comden, Green) – 3:39

Personnel 
 Performance
 Mel Tormé - vocals, drums
 Joe Mondragon - double bass
 Mel Lewis - drums
 Vincent DeRosa - french horn
 Marty Paich - piano, arranger
 Art Pepper - alto saxophone
 Bill Hood - baritone saxophone
 Bill Perkins - tenor saxophone
 Frank Rosolino - trombone
 Al Porcino - trumpet
 Stu Williamson - trumpet
 Red Callender - tuba
Production
 Val Valentin - engineer
 Russell Garcia - producer

References 

1960 albums
Mel Tormé albums
Albums arranged by Marty Paich
Verve Records albums